KOVR (channel 13) is a television station licensed to Stockton, California, United States, serving as the CBS outlet for the Sacramento area. It is owned and operated by the network's CBS News and Stations division alongside CW affiliate KMAX-TV (channel 31). Both stations share studios on KOVR Drive in West Sacramento, while KOVR's transmitter is located in Walnut Grove, California.

KOVR began broadcasting in September 1954 from studios in Stockton and a transmitter atop Mount Diablo. This facility provided wide coverage from San Francisco to Sacramento and beyond, but KOVR could not obtain a network affiliation in the San Francisco market, whereas its move completely into the Stockton/Sacramento area in 1957 resulted in an affiliation with ABC. After moving, the station was sold twice before being acquired by newspaper publisher McClatchy in 1963. McClatchy would sell the station in 1980 under intense pressure on owners of newspaper-broadcast combinations, and it changed hands another six times from 1983 to 1996. The station became a CBS affiliate in 1995 as the result of an affiliation switch and was purchased by CBS in 2005; uniquely, it broadcasts prime time programming one hour ahead of other West Coast stations. Traditionally a third-rated station in local news, ratings have gradually improved for its newscasts since the 1990s.

History

The Mount Diablo years

On March 5, 1948, Radio Diablo, Inc. (later Television Diablo) filed an application for a new television station to broadcast on channel 13, first assigned to San Francisco and then to San Jose, from Mount Diablo in Contra Costa County. From Mount Diablo, the principals in Radio Diablo operated FM station KSBR, which had an effective radiated power of 250,000 watts and, having just moved to the mountaintop, claimed it was heard from the Oregon state line to Bakersfield. Two other groups applied for the channel by late 1948, but they would all have to wait after the Federal Communications Commission (FCC) imposed a freeze on new television station awards that would last nearly four years. When the freeze ended, channel 13 had been removed from San Jose to Stockton, where it could still cover the city of license from Mount Diablo. In addition to Radio Diablo, another Stockton broadcasting station applied for the channel: radio station KXOB. Radio Diablo, headed by O. H. Brown, estimated it could serve 3.5 million people in San Francisco, Stockton, and Sacramento from its mountaintop site. The owners of KXOB would ultimately receive shares in Radio Diablo in a settlement agreement, and broadcaster and furniture store owner Edward Peffer did likewise, paving the way for the FCC to grant Radio Diablo the construction permit on February 11, 1954. Leslie Hoffman, who had become the new president of the company, was to have the station named for him as KHOF, but when Hoffman thought of the possibility of "cough" puns based on the designation, the call sign was changed to KOVR, for "coverage".

KOVR began broadcasting September 6, 1954; after an opening night produced in the Stockton studios, the highlight of its first days on the air was live coverage from the California State Fair. It had studios in Stockton on Miner Avenue, as well as a converted bus serving as a remote broadcast van along with two other mobile units. KOVR was the second television station in Stockton; a UHF outlet, KTVU (channel 36), had gone on the air the previous December.

As an independent station without network affiliation, the program schedule was heavy with local programming. Lynn Taylor hosted a talent show, a weeknight "Do It Yourself" show, and a teen program. Sportscaster Bob Fouts began commuting to Stockton from San Francisco to host a sports show, leaving KGO-TV in that city, and regional news coverage and a bingo program were also slated. Art Finley hosted an afternoon children's program, Toonytown, on the station for several years before moving to San Francisco's KRON-TV. By 1955, the station had opened offices in San Francisco, where at one point it was proposed that NBC might try to affiliate with or purchase KOVR given discord with KRON-TV, its San Francisco affiliate, and a desire by NBC to own its San Francisco outlet. It attempted to move its main operation from Stockton to San Francisco, a proposal denied by the FCC as stripping Stockton of its lone VHF television station and being unnecessary given the number of television channels allotted to the Bay Area, though the company did announce it would add a studio in San Francisco on a secondary basis. This studio was located in the Mark Hopkins Hotel, where the San Francisco offices were also relocated. In December 1955, Variety magazine reported that CBS, which coveted a VHF owned-and-operated station to serve San Francisco but had affiliate KPIX-TV there instead, was bidding on KOVR.

However, as time went on, it became clear that in order to provide adequate programming and secure economic viability, a network affiliation would be necessary; Bob Foster, the media critic for The Times newspaper in San Mateo, described the station as "suffering from the lack of sponsors, the lack of network affiliation—at least one that meant anything—and from a lack of good programs". The station found itself paying for films and syndicated programs at San Francisco market rates while selling advertising at rates befitting its city of license, the much smaller Stockton; if it were to move out of the San Francisco market, it could cut its film acquisition costs by half. KOVR had no prospect of attaining a network alliance in the San Francisco market. However, opportunity lay in Sacramento. By 1956, there were three television stations in Sacramento itself. On the VHF band were CBS affiliate KBET-TV (channel 10) and NBC affiliate KCRA-TV (channel 3), which had begun the year before, and a UHF station, KCCC-TV (channel 40), which was the local outlet for ABC and had been in service since 1953. As not all television sets could receive UHF, UHF stations were generally at a disadvantage to VHF stations, which networks and advertisers preferred to air their programming. In a bid to obtain the ABC affiliation while eliminating overlap to ABC-owned KGO-TV in San Francisco, KOVR filed in August 1956 to move from Mount Diablo to Butte Mountain near Jackson in Amador County, a proposal that blindsided a clearly endangered KCCC-TV. This application was initially approved by the FCC in November, though KCCC-TV management protested the decision as a Stockton station encroaching on the Sacramento market. As a result, the FCC stayed its grant of the construction permit in January 1957.

KOVR blindsided KCCC-TV again in February 1957 when it announced that, beginning February 17, it would become an ABC affiliate, something that the network had previously promised KCCC-TV as not forthcoming until after the Butte Mountain move was approved. The relocation application was granted again in April after KCCC-TV withdrew its opposition.

On May 31, 1957, KCCC-TV ceased broadcasting in what amounted to a partial merger with KOVR. The Stockton station became the ABC affiliate of record for Sacramento—already simulcasting many ABC programs with channel 40—as KCCC-TV owner Lincoln Dellar purchased stock in Television Diablo. The move to Butte Mountain became effective on October 28, 1957, taking KOVR out of conflict with the Bay Area television stations and cementing its status as a Stockton station serving Sacramento instead of San Francisco.

Gannett and Metromedia ownership
As work continued on the Butte Mountain transmitter, Television Diablo began to seek a buyer for KOVR. It first proposed to sell the station to the Hudson Valley Broadcasting Company of Albany, New York—which was in the process of buying a television station in Durham, North Carolina, and renaming itself the Capital Cities Broadcasting Company; despite the FCC's blessing, this sale was not consummated and dismissed in November. Weeks later, the Gannett Company of Rochester, New York, entered into an agreement to acquire the station, taking ownership in February 1958. For Gannett, KOVR was far-flung compared to its other media properties. It owned radio and television stations in New York and Illinois as well as newspapers in those states, New Jersey, and Connecticut. The next year, KOVR reopened KCCC-TV's former Sacramento studios on Garden Highway, also providing use of the facilities by new educational station KVIE.

After less than two years of ownership, as well as the end of talks between Gannett and 20th Century Fox, Gannett applied to sell KOVR to the Metropolitan Broadcasting Company, owned by John Kluge, in 1959. (This company renamed itself Metromedia in 1961.) Metromedia's ownership of KOVR would be highlighted by its participation in the Trans-Tower project that built a common transmission facility for Sacramento's three commercial television stations in Walnut Grove. Expanding production of commercials and other programming in Sacramento eventually led KOVR to leave the Garden Highway facilities and renovate a former Red Heart bakery on Arden Way to serve as its Sacramento studio and news center, operating alongside the Miner Avenue plant in Stockton.

The McClatchy years
On October 4, 1963, Metromedia announced it would sell KOVR for $7.65 million to McClatchy Newspapers, publisher of The Sacramento Bee and The Modesto Bee newspapers and owner of radio stations KBEE (970 AM) in Modesto and KFBK (1530 AM) and KFBK-FM 92.5 in Sacramento. For McClatchy, the contract to buy a television station serving Sacramento fulfilled a long-held dream of the company. McClatchy had desired to build a station in Sacramento since 1948, when it applied for channel 10. While an FCC examiner's initial decision favored McClatchy for the station, its competition, a group known as Sacramento Telecasters and consisting of non-broadcast interests, successfully objected the award on diversification of media ownership grounds, with the FCC unanimously overturning the examiner and granting Sacramento Telecasters the permit for what signed on as KBET-TV. McClatchy continued legal action to try and force a rehearing on its proposal until February 1958.

Several groups expressed concern about concentration of media ownership. The sale was initially opposed by a group calling itself the Citizens Committee to Promote Fair Coverage, which felt that a McClatchy purchase of KOVR would result in a "monopoly of news", while the Stockton city council, fearful of the station reducing its presence in its city of license, initially voted unanimously to request an FCC hearing before rescinding the resolution after Eleanor McClatchy wrote to the body, assuring them that the station would not leave. The FCC initially indicated the deal would require a hearing, an action recommended by commission staff, but reversed course in July 1964, approving the acquisition on a 5–2 vote.

Since 1943, cartoon bees designed by Walt Disney, "Scoopy" and "Gaby", had been used to promote the Bee newspapers and radio stations. In 1953, when KMJ-TV, the McClatchy TV station in Fresno, began broadcasting, a third bee, "Teevy", joined them. In 1967, a new animated sign-on and sign-off sequence was created for KOVR and KMJ-TV featuring Teevy. The animation had been designed under Disney's supervision before his December 1966 death.

McClatchy's ownership of KOVR was dogged by groups seeking to force the matter on antitrust issues as early as the late 1960s. In 1969, McKeon Construction, a Sacramento firm, asked a U.S. district court to void the FCC's 1964 approval of the sale, which it claimed enhanced an existing monopoly on regional advertising; McClatchy sources told Broadcasting magazine that the firm's ire had likely been provoked by unflattering coverage of its owner and of political pressures placed by Sacramento construction companies. The lawsuit was dropped in 1971. Similarly, in 1974, the San Joaquin County Economic Development Association appealed to the FCC and asked it to review whether KOVR was adequately serving Stockton.

Cross-ownership woes
However, in the second half of the 1970s, a new tenor taken by federal regulators toward cross-ownership of newspapers and broadcast stations significantly escalated the public pressure on McClatchy to act. In 1975, the FCC moved to bar future acquisitions that created cross-ownership and ordered 16 such groups in small markets to break up their holdings, though others were allowed to remain grandfathered. Two years later, on March 1, 1977, a federal appeals court turned the policy on its head and ordered the divestiture of all such pairings except those that were in the public interest.

Within days, McClatchy announced an agreement with Multimedia, Inc., designed to extricate both groups from their heaviest cross-ownership burdens. Where McClatchy owned a newspaper, AM, FM, and TV stations between Sacramento and Stockton, Multimedia had a similar situation in Greenville, South Carolina: two newspapers (morning daily The Greenville News and the afternoon The Greenville Piedmont), WFBC and WFBC-FM radio, as well as WFBC-TV, an NBC-affiliated TV station. McClatchy and Multimedia proposed a straight trade whereby the former would acquire WFBC-TV and Multimedia would receive KOVR. Petitions were lodged against the deal by organizations in Greenville and Sacramento, as well as the San Joaquin Communications Corporation. The former two groups emphasized the unfamiliarity of the companies to their new markets, calling McClatchy "totally foreign" to upstate South Carolina and Multimedia "completely unknown to the Sacramento community". The latter had been in a legal battle since 1974 seeking to wrest KMJ-TV in Fresno from McClatchy control. While the community organizations abandoned their opposition to the trade, San Joaquin Communications Corporation refused to yield, and the transaction reached its deadline date of March 1, 1978, without being adjudicated by the FCC. At that time, negotiations to extend the term failed, and the deal was called off in March 1978; the two companies announced that enough time had lapsed that changes at the stations had occurred that were not "mutually agreeable adjustments".

McClatchy entered into an agreement to sell KMJ-TV to the San Joaquin Communications Corporation in May 1979, seeking to avoid a lengthy legal battle over the Fresno outlet. The company then decided to put KOVR, its only other television station, up for sale. Citing "increasingly strong government opposition" to cross-ownership, president C. K. McClatchy II noted that he felt it was in the community interest to ensure an "orderly transition" of ownership at KOVR.

Changing ownership, falling ratings
On July 5, 1979, McClatchy announced it would sell KOVR to The Outlet Company of Providence, Rhode Island, for $65 million, with C. K. McClatchy noting that Outlet was selected despite not making the highest offer because it had committed to ensuring local minority ownership in KOVR by selling 10 percent of the station's stock to minorities; the deal was consummated in May 1980. The deal was the second-most expensive single-station TV station transaction ever. To reduce debt incurred in the KOVR purchase, Outlet then sold 91 department stores. During Outlet ownership, ratings for KOVR's newscasts fell to third place, behind KXTV and far behind a dominant KCRA. This occurred despite an infusion of resources to improve KOVR's news ratings. 

The Outlet sale was the first in seven different ownership transactions involving KOVR between 1980 and 1996. In what was the second-largest group station deal for its time, in 1983, Outlet was purchased by the Rockefeller Group after Coca-Cola walked away from a purchase agreement the year before. After the Rockefeller purchase, KOVR became the first station in Northern California to broadcast in stereo sound, doing so in February 1985. It also became the first local broadcast home of the newly-relocated Sacramento Kings basketball team in 1985.

In a management buyout that restored Outlet Communications to separate status, Rockefeller Group sold the firm in 1986 for $625 million. To raise capital, some stations were immediately divested, among them KOVR, which was sold on for $104 million to another Rhode Island concern, Narragansett Capital Corporation, as its first television property. Amidst these two transactions, KOVR laid off 10 employees, and morale was low due to poor ratings in part attributable to the national underperformance of ABC at the time. The Kings had been one of the station's bright spots, but the team sued KOVR in August 1986 for breach of contract, alleging the station owed it hundreds of thousands of dollars and had tried to renegotiate the pact; it was another three years before a judge ruled in favor of the Kings. 1986 also saw the station break ground on its present transmission tower, a  mast in Walnut Grove, in a joint venture with KXTV. Otherwise, Narragansett—a holding company, not a broadcasting firm—generally underinvested in KOVR; one rival broadcaster commented that the company had "stripped the station clean".

AnchorMedia ownership and move to West Sacramento
In 1988, Narragansett received between seven and eleven offers, all unsolicited, for KOVR, and it opted to cash out by selling the station to AnchorMedia, a broadcasting company owned by Texas billionaire Robert Bass, for $162 million—a price considered to be "top dollar". The Bass Group had been making major business investments in Sacramento, including a purchase of land in Roseville and the acquisition of the insolvent American Savings and Loan in Stockton. AnchorMedia then sued Narragansett for allegedly withholding information and taking away key employees.

The immediate task facing AnchorMedia management was one of procuring a new facility, as the Arden Way site had become overcrowded and insufficient for KOVR's needs. Outlet had bought land in Natomas for a potential new studio site, but Narragansett sold the parcel; Anchor began scouting property in West Sacramento. In late 1990, the new $8 million,  facility opened, featuring two studios as well as a helipad for the station's news helicopter.

River City and Sinclair ownership; affiliation switch to CBS
In 1994, Continental Broadcasting—the former AnchorMedia—was purchased by River City Broadcasting, a St. Louis-based owner of television and radio properties. The three ABC affiliates owned by Anchor represented River City's first major network affiliates.

River City would find itself navigating an affiliation switch. Amid a major national realignment, the A. H. Belo Corporation and ABC renewed their agreement for Belo's ABC-affiliated stations in Dallas and Norfolk, Virginia, including the move of ABC's Sacramento affiliation to the higher-rated KXTV. As a result, KOVR aligned with CBS. The switch took place on March 6, 1995.

Uniquely for the market, KOVR would adopt an early prime schedule and air weeknight CBS programming from 7 to 10 p.m. instead of from 8 to 11 p.m. At the time, KPIX-TV, the CBS affiliate in San Francisco, programmed on a similar basis (abandoning the practice in 1998), and KCRA-TV had done so with NBC programming between 1991 and 1993. The early prime move was designed to help KOVR's ratings by airing its late news for one hour at 10 p.m. and counterprogramming the 11 p.m. newscasts with The Late Show with David Letterman.

For the seventh time in 16 years, KOVR was sold again in 1996 when River City Broadcasting was acquired by Sinclair Broadcast Group of Baltimore. In 2001, KOVR gained attention when it landed a "local exclusive" interview, conducted by reporter Jodi Hernandez with congressman Gary Condit regarding the Chandra Levy murder case; Condit appeared the same evening on ABC, in an interview with Connie Chung.

CBS ownership
By 2004, Sinclair was eyeing the creation of duopolies in as many markets as possible and seeking to sell stations in markets where it had no feasible options to create one. One of those markets was Sacramento. As a result, Sinclair agreed to sell to the Viacom Television Stations Group—the owned-and-operated stations division of CBS—in December 2004 for $285 million. This created a duopoly with then-UPN affiliate KMAX-TV (channel 31). In order to remain under ownership limits for radio stations in Sacramento, Viacom sold San Francisco radio station KFRC (610 AM).

While operations of KMAX-TV moved in with KOVR in West Sacramento, resulting in the layoffs of 11 newly redundant employees, $7 million was spent on capital improvements at the studios, where some of the equipment had not been replaced since AnchorMedia built the facility 15 years prior. Though speculation emerged at the time of the sale that CBS might abolish the early prime scheduling that KOVR had used for a decade, thereby bringing the station in line with its other West Coast outlets, CBS ultimately preserved the practice and even expanded it by shifting weekend programming up an hour in 2006.

News operation
Local news started with the station in 1954; the original news department consisted of three full-time employees and a part-time photographer, with Mel Riddle as news anchor and editor. In the early years, the station provided extensive film footage of events and used its remote vans to cover such events as flooding in Marysville.

Traditionally, KOVR's newscasts placed third in the Sacramento market. At times, not even KXTV and KOVR combined could equal KCRA-TV's news ratings. Newscasts were produced from both the Stockton and Sacramento studios, and the geographic distance between the news crews sometimes hampered the functioning of the news operation. Even though KOVR's news budget often exceeded that of KXTV, KOVR typically tied that station or was narrowly edged out.

In the 1990s and early 2000s, despite a general lack of investment from Sinclair—which stripped the station of its helicopter and satellite truck and abandoned having a weeknight sports anchor—and a comparatively underresourced position, the lean KOVR news operation began to show signs of improvement and increased ratings. In 1994, longtime KCRA-TV anchor Stan Atkinson moved to KOVR and presented the station's weeknight newscasts until his retirement in 1999.

As part of Viacom's remake of KOVR's news department, Sam Shane, a former KCRA-TV anchor who spent two years at MSNBC, was hired to anchor the station's newscasts, and personnel were shuffled on other programs; a 4 p.m. newscast was also added. Between 2006 and 2010, KOVR surpassed KXTV in morning and early evening news.

In 2018, KOVR began airing CBS late night programming at 11:35 p.m., debuting a regular 11 p.m. weeknight newscast for the first time since 1995. In addition to its noon and evening news offerings, the KOVR-KMAX news operation produces Good Day (formerly Good Day Sacramento), which is simulcast weekday mornings from 4:30 to 7 a.m. on KOVR and KMAX (as CBS 13 Mornings) and then airs on the latter station until 11 a.m. every morning.

As part of a rollout of streaming news channels across the CBS station group, CBSN Sacramento (now CBS News Sacramento) began operating on June 16, 2021.

Notable former on-air staff 

 Stan Atkinson – anchor (1994–1999)
 Claudia Cowan – anchor/reporter
 Kristine Hanson – meteorologist
 Lois Hart – anchor
 Bob Hilton – anchor
 Kinsey Schofield – anchor/reporter, Good Day Sacramento (2017)
 Steve Somers – sports anchor
 Dave Walker – anchor
 Jim Wieder – reporter/anchor

Technical information

Subchannels
The station's digital signal is multiplexed:

Though it does not host any additional subchannels, KOVR is part of Sacramento's ATSC 3.0 (NextGen TV) deployment on KQCA, which began operating in July 2021.

Analog-to-digital conversion
KOVR shut down its analog signal, over VHF channel 13, on June 12, 2009, as part of the federally mandated transition from analog to digital television. The station's digital signal remained on its pre-transition UHF channel 25.

References

External links

CBS News and Stations
OVR
CBS network affiliates
Metromedia
Television channels and stations established in 1954
West Sacramento, California
Stockton, California
Start TV affiliates
Dabl affiliates
Former Gannett subsidiaries